Micral is a series of microcomputers produced by the French company Réalisation d'Études Électroniques (R2E), beginning with the Micral N in early 1973. The Micral N was the first commercially available microprocessor-based computer.

In 1986, three judges at The Computer Museum, Boston – Apple II designer and Apple Inc. co-founder Steve Wozniak, early MITS employee and PC World publisher David Bunnell, and the museum's associate director and curator Oliver Strimpel – awarded the title of "first personal computer using a microprocessor" to the 1973 Micral. The Micral N was the earliest commercial, non-kit personal computer based on a microprocessor (in this case, the Intel 8008).

The Computer History Museum currently says that the Micral is one of the earliest commercial, non-kit personal computers.  The 1971 Kenbak-1, invented before the first microprocessor, is considered to be the world's first "personal computer". That machine did not have a one-chip CPU but instead was based purely on small-scale integration TTL chips.

Micral N 
R2E founder André Truong Trong Thi (EFREI degree, Paris), a French immigrant from Vietnam, asked Frenchman François Gernelle to develop the Micral N computer for the Institut National de la Recherche Agronomique (INRA), starting in June 1972. Alain Perrier of INRA was looking for a computer for process control in his crop evapotranspiration measurements. The software was developed by Benchetrit. Beckmann designed the I/O boards and controllers for peripheral magnetic storage. Lacombe was responsible for the memory system, I/O high speed channel, power supply and front panel. Gernelle invented the Micral N, which was much smaller than existing minicomputers.  The January 1974 Users Manual called it "the first of a new generation of mini-computer whose principal feature is its very low cost," and said, "MICRAL's principal use is in process control.  It does not aim to be an universal mini-computer."

The computer was to be delivered in December 1972, and Gernelle, Lacombe, Benchetrit and Beckmann had to work in a cellar in Châtenay-Malabry for 18 hours a day in order to deliver the computer in time.  The software, the ROM-based MIC 01 monitor and the ASMIC 01 assembler, was written on an Intertechnique Multi-8 minicomputer using a cross assembler. The computer was based on an Intel 8008 microprocessor clocked at 500 kHz. It had a backplane bus, called the Pluribus with 74-pin connector. 14 boards could be plugged in a Pluribus. With two Pluribus, the Micral N could support up to 24 boards. The computer used MOS memory instead of core memory. The Micral N could support parallel and serial input/output. It had 8 levels of interrupt and a stack. The computer was programmed with punched tape, and used a teleprinter or modem for I/O.  The front panel console was optional, offering customers the option of designing their own console to match a particular application.  It was delivered to the INRA in January 1973, and commercialized in February 1973 for FF 8,500 (about $1,750) making it a cost-effective replacement for minicomputers which augured the era of the PC.

France had produced the first microcomputer. A year would pass before the first North American microcomputer, SCELBI, was advertised in the March 1974 issue of QST, an amateur radio magazine.

Indeed, INRA was originally planning to use PDP-8 computers for process control, but the Micral N could do the same for a fifth of the cost.  An 8-inch floppy disk reader was added to the Micral in December 1973, following a command of the Commissariat à l'Energie Atomique. This was made possible by the pile-canal, a buffer that could accept one megabyte per second. In 1974, a keyboard and screen were fitted to the Micral computers. A hard disk (first made by CAELUS then by Diablo) became available in 1975. In 1979, the Micral 8031 D was equipped with a 5" 1/4 inches hard disk of 5 Megabytes made by Shugart.

Later models 
Following the April 1974 introduction of the Intel 8080, R2E introduced the second and third Micral models, 8008-based at 1 MHz Micral G and 8080-based at 1 MHz Micral S.

In November 1975, R2E signed Warner & Swasey Company as the exclusive manufacturer and marketer of the Micral line in the United States and Canada.  Warner & Swasey marketed its Micral-based system for industrial data processing applications such as engineering data analysis, accounting and inventory control.  R2E and Warner & Swasey displayed the Micral M multiple microcomputer system at the June 1976 National Computer Conference.  The Micral M consists of up to eight Micral S microcomputers, each with its own local memory and sharing the common memory so the local and common memory look like one monolithic memory for each processor.  The system has a distributed multiprocessor operating system R2E said was based on sharing common resources and real-time task management.

Some time after the July 1976 introduction of the Zilog Z80, came the Z80-based Micral CZ.  The 8080-based Micral C, an intelligent CRT terminal designed for word processing and automatic typesetting, was introduced in July 1977.  It has two Shugart SA400 minifloppy drives and a panel of system control and sense switches below the minifloppy drives.  Business application language (BAL) and FORTRAN are supported.  By October, R2E had set up an American subsidiary, R2E of America, in Minneapolis.  The Micral V Portable (1978) could run FORTRAN and assembler under the Sysmic operating system, or BAL.  The original Sysmic operating system was renamed Prologue in 1978. Prologue was able to perform real-time multitasking, and was a multi-user system. R2E offered CP/M for the Micral C in 1979.

The R2E Micral CCMC Portal portable microcomputer made its official appearance in September 1980 at the SICOB show in Paris. It was designed and marketed by the studies and developments department of François Gernelle of the french firm R2E Micral at the request of the company CCMC specializing in payroll and accounting. The Portal was based on an Intel 8085 processor, 8-bit, clocked at 2 MHz. Its operating system was Prologue.

Later Micrals used the Intel 8088.  The last Micral designed by François Gernelle was the 9020. In 1981, R2E was bought by Groupe Bull. Starting with the Bull Micral 30, which could use both Prologue and MS-DOS, Groupe Bull transformed the Micral computers into a line of PC compatibles. François Gernelle left Bull in 1983.

Legacy 
Truong's R2E sold about 90,000 units of the Micral that were mostly used in vertical applications such as highway toll booths and process control.

Litigation followed after Truong started claiming that he alone invented the first personal computer.  The courts did not judge in favor of Truong, who was declared "the businessman, but not the inventor", giving in 1998 the sole claim as inventor of the first personal computer to Gernelle and the R2E engineering team.

In the mid-1970s, Philippe Kahn was a programmer for the Micral.  Kahn later headed Borland which released Turbo Pascal and Sidekick in 1983.

Paul G. Allen, the co-founder of Microsoft with Bill Gates, bought a Micral N by the auctioneer Rouillac at the Artigny Castle in France, on June 11, 2017 for his Seattle museum Living Computers: Museum + Labs.

Micral computer models

R2E series 

 1973 : Micral N, first microcomputer, built by François Gernelle.
 1974 : Micral G, Intel 8008 at 1 MHz, 16K RAM
 1974 : Micral S, Intel 8080
 1976 : Micral M, distributed system, Intel 8080 × 8
 1977 : Micral C, Intel 8080, 24K RAM, integrated monitor, floppy disc drive
 1978 : Micral V, Intel 8080, 32K RAM, portable

Bull series 

 1979 : Micral 80-30, Zilog Z80
 1980 : Micral 80-20, Zilog Z80A at 3 MHz
 1980 : Portal,  Intel 8085 at 2 MHz
 1981 : Micral P2,  Zilog Z80 at 5 MHz, 64K RAM
 1981 : Micral X,  Zilog Z80, 10MB hard disc (CII Honeywell Bull D140)
 1983 : Micral 90-20, Intel 8088 at 5 MHz
 1983 : Micral 90-50, Intel 8086 at 8 MHz, 256K RAM

PC compatible series 
 1985 : Bull Micral 30, Intel 8088 at 4.77 MHz, PC-XT compatible (Nanoréseau network machine)
 1986 : Bull Micral 60, Intel 80286 at 6 MHz, PC-AT compatible
 1986 : Bull Micral 35, Intel 80286 at 8 MHz
 1987 : Bull Micral 40, Intel 80286 at 8 MHz
 1988 : Bull Micral 45, Intel 80286 at 12 MHz
 1988 : Bull Micral 65, Intel 80286 at 12 MHz
 1988 : Bull Micral 75, Intel 80386 at 8 MHz
 1988 : Bull Micral Attaché, Intel 8086 at 9.54 MHz, portable
 1989 : Bull Micral 200, Intel 80286 at 12 MHz
 1989 : Bull Micral 600, Intel 80386 at 25 MHz
 Unknown year : Bull Micral 500, Intel 80386 at 20 MHz, Micro Channel bus

In 1989 Bull buys Zenith Data Systems, starting to release PC compatibles under the brand Zenith.

See also 
History of computing hardware (1960s–present)
History of personal computers
Intellec
List of early microcomputers
Portal laptop computer
Computing for All, a French government plan to introduce computers to the country's pupils

References

External links 

 Gernelle and Truong
 A picture of the Front panel of Micral-N
 François Gernelle LA NAISSANCE DU PREMIER MICRO-ORDINATEUR : LE MICRAL N ("The birth of the first microcomputer: the Micral N") Proceedings of the second symposium on the history of computing (CNAM, Paris, 1990)
 François Gernelle Communication sur les choix architecturaux et technologiques qui ont présidé à la conception du « Micral » Premier micro-ordinateur au monde  Proceedings of the fifth symposium on the history of computing (Toulouse, 1998)
 French patent FR2216883 (number INPI: 73 03 553), German patent DE2404886, Dutch Patent NL7401328, Japanese patent JP50117333  (inventor François Gernelle) RECHNER, INSBESONDERE FUER REALZEIT-ANWENDUNG (August 8, 1974)
 French patent FR2216884(number INPI: 7303552), German patent DE2404887, Dutch patent NL7401271, Japanese patent JP50117327 (inventor François Gernelle)  KANAL FUER DEN INFORMATIONSAUSTAUSCH ZWISCHEN EINEM RECHNER UND SCHNELLEN PERIPHEREN EINHEITEN (August 8, 1974)
 :  Data processing system, specially for real-time  applications
 : Channel for exchanging information between a computer and rapid peripheral units (pile-canal)
 MICRAL documentation at bitsavers.org

Early microcomputers
Computer companies of France
Groupe Bull
8-bit computers
History of computing in France
Computer science education in France
Computing for All